Viera Mašlejová (born 22 August 1991) is a Slovak footballer who plays as a forward. She has been a member of the Slovakia women's national team.

References

1991 births
Living people
Women's association football forwards
Slovak women's footballers
Slovakia women's international footballers
FK Slovan Duslo Šaľa (women) players